The following is a list of the monastic houses in South Yorkshire, England.

See also
 List of monastic houses in England

Notes

References

History of South Yorkshire
England in the High Middle Ages
Medieval sites in England
Lists of buildings and structures in South Yorkshire
Yorkshire South
Yorkshire, South